I'm Only A Woman may refer to:

I'm Only a Woman (Dottie West album)
I'm Only A Woman (Ben Peters song), written Ben Peters 1970, sung by Jane Morgan 1970, Skeeter Davis 1970, Lucille Starr	1970,	Dottie West	1972 
"I Am Only A Woman", song by 	Judy Stone  Arnold 1970